The Book of Ruth (Megilath Ruth, "the Scroll of Ruth", one of the Five Megillot) is included in the third division, or the Writings (Ketuvim), of the Hebrew Bible. In most Christian canons it is treated as one of the historical books and placed between Judges and 1 Samuel.

The book, written in Hebrew in the 6th–4th centuries BCE, tells of the Moabite woman Ruth, who accepts Yahweh, the God of the Israelites, as her God and accepts the Israelite people as her own. In Ruth 1:16–17, Ruth tells Naomi, her Israelite mother-in-law, "Where you go I will go, and where you stay I will stay. Your people will be my people and your God my God. Where you die I will die, and there I will be buried. May the Lord deal with me, be it ever so severely, if even death separates you and me."

The book is held in esteem by Jews who fall under the category of Jews-by-choice, as is evidenced by the considerable presence of Boaz in rabbinic literature. The Book of Ruth also functions liturgically, as it is read during the Jewish holiday of Shavuot ("Weeks").

Structure

The book is structured into four chapters: the 2rd book is 5 chapters.

Act 1: Prologue and Problem: Death and Emptiness (1:1–22)
Scene 1: Setting the scene (1:1–5)
Scene 2: Naomi returns home (1:6–18)
Scene 3: Arrival of Naomi and Ruth in Bethlehem (1:19–22)

Act 2:  Ruth Meets Boaz, Naomi's Relative, on the Harvest Field (2:1–23)
Scene 1: Ruth in the field of Boaz (2:1–17)
Scene 2: Ruth reports to Naomi (2:18–23)

Act 3:  Naomi Sends Ruth to Boaz on the Threshing Floor (3:1–18)
Scene 1: Naomi Reveals Her Plan (3:1–5)
Scene 2: Ruth at the threshing-floor of Boaz (3:6–15)
Scene 3: Ruth reports to Naomi (3:16–18)

Act 4:  Resolution and Epilogue:  Life and Fullness (4:1–22)
Scene 1: Boaz with the men at the gate (4:1–12)
Scene 2: A son is born to Ruth (4:13–17) 

Genealogical appendix (4:18–22)

Summary

During the time of the judges, an Israelite family from Bethlehem (who are Ephrathites) – Elimelech, his wife Naomi, and their sons Mahlon and Chilion – emigrated to the nearby country of Moab. Elimelech died, and the sons married two Moabite women: Mahlon married Ruth and Chilion married Orpah.

After about ten years, the two sons of Naomi also died in Moab (1:4). Naomi decided to return to Bethlehem. She told her daughters-in-law to return to their own mothers and remarry. Orpah reluctantly left. However, Ruth said,  "Do not urge me to leave you, to turn back and not follow you. For wherever you go, I will go; wherever you lodge, I will lodge; your people shall be my people, and your God my God. Where you die, I will die, and there I will be buried. Thus and more may the Lord do to me if anything but death parts me from you." (Ruth 1:16–17 NJPS).

Naomi and Ruth returned to Bethlehem at the beginning of the barley harvest and, in order to support her mother-in-law and herself, Ruth went to the fields to glean. As it happened, the field she went to belonged to a man named Boaz, who was kind to her because he had heard of her loyalty to her mother-in-law. Ruth told Naomi of Boaz's kindness, and Ruth continued to glean in his field through the remainder of barley and wheat harvest.

Boaz, being a close relative of Naomi's husband's family, was therefore obliged by the levirate law to marry Ruth (Mahlon's widow) to carry on his family's inheritance. Naomi sent Ruth to the threshing floor at night where Boaz slept, telling Ruth to "uncover his feet and lie down. He will tell you what you are to do." (3:4). Ruth did so. Boaz asked her who she was, and she replied: "I am your handmaid Ruth. Spread your robe over your handmaid, for you are a redeeming kinsman" (3:9 NJPS). Acknowledging he was a close relative, Boaz blessed her and agreed to do all that was required. He noted that "all the elders of my town know what a fine woman you are" (3:11 NJPS). However, Boaz told her that there was a closer male relative. Ruth remained in submission at his feet until she returned to the city in the morning.

Early that day, Boaz went to the city gate to meet with the other male relative before the town elders. (The relative is not named. Boaz addresses him as ploni almoni literally "so and so".) The unnamed relative, unwilling to jeopardize the inheritance of his own estate by marrying Ruth, relinquishes his right of redemption, thus allowing Boaz to marry Ruth. They transfer the property and thus redeem it, and they ratify the redemption by the nearer kinsman taking off his shoe and handing it over to Boaz. Ruth 4:7 notes for later generations that:
Now this was formerly done in Israel in cases of redemption or exchange: to validate any transaction, one man would take off his sandal and hand it to the other. Such was the practice in Israel. (NJPS)

Boaz and Ruth were then married and had a son. The women of the city celebrated Naomi's joy, for Naomi had found a redeemer for her family name. Naomi took the child and placed it on her bosom.

The child was named Obed, whom the reader discovers is "the father of Jesse, the father of David" (Ruth 4:13–17), that is, the grandfather of King David.

The book concludes with an appendix which traces the Davidic genealogy all the way back from Perez, "whom Tamar bore to Judah", through to Obed, down to David.

Composition
The book does not name its author. It is traditionally ascribed to the prophet Samuel (11th century BCE), but Ruth's identity as a non-Israelite and the stress on the need for an inclusive attitude towards foreigners suggests an origin in the fifth century BCE, when intermarriage had become controversial (as seen in Ezra 9:1 and Nehemiah 13:1). A substantial number of scholars therefore date it to the Persian period (6th–4th centuries BCE). The genealogy that concludes the book is believed to be a post-exilic Priestly addition, as it adds nothing to the plot; nevertheless, it is carefully crafted and integrates the book into the history of Israel running from Genesis to Kings.

Themes and background

Levirate marriage and the "redeemers"
The Book of Ruth illustrates the difficulty of trying to use laws given in books such as Deuteronomy as evidence of actual practice. Naomi planned to provide security for herself and Ruth by arranging a levirate marriage with Boaz. She instructed Ruth to uncover Boaz's feet after he had gone to sleep and to lie down. When Boaz woke up, surprised to see a woman at his feet, Ruth explained that she wanted him to redeem (marry) her. Some modern commentators see sexual allusions in this part of the story, with 'feet' as a euphemism for genitals.

Since there was no heir to inherit Elimelech's land, custom required a close relative (usually the dead man's brother) to marry the widow of the deceased in order to continue his family line (Deuteronomy 25:5–10). This relative was called the goel, the "kinsman-redeemer". As Boaz was not Elimelech's brother, nor was Ruth his widow, scholars refer to the arrangement here as "Levirate-like". A complication arises in the story: another man was a closer relative to Elimelech than Boaz and had first claim on Ruth. This conflict was resolved through the custom that required land to stay in the family: a family could mortgage land to ward off poverty, but the law required a kinsman to purchase it back into the family (Leviticus 25:25ff). Boaz met the near kinsman at the city gate (the place where contracts were settled); the kinsman first said he would purchase Elimelech's (now Naomi's) land, but, upon hearing he must also take Ruth as his wife, withdrew his offer. Boaz thus became Ruth and Naomi's "kinsman-redeemer."

Mixed marriage
The book can be read as a political parable relating to issues around the time of Ezra and Nehemiah (the 4th century BCE). The realistic nature of the story is established from the start through the names of the participants: the husband and father was Elimelech, meaning "My God is King", and his wife was Naomi, "Pleasing", but after the deaths of her sons Mahlon, "Sickness", and Chilion, "Wasting", she asked to be called Mara, "Bitter". Despite this, Ruth the Moabite married a Judahite and even after his death still regarded herself a member of his family; she then married another Judahite and bore him a son who became an ancestor of David. Concerning this, the Mishnah says that only male Moabites are banned from the congregation. Unlike the story of Ezra–Nehemiah, where marriages between Jewish men and non-Jewish women were broken up, Ruth teaches that foreigners who convert to Judaism can become good Jews, foreign wives can become exemplary followers of Jewish law, and there is no reason to exclude them or their offspring from the community.

Contemporary interpretations
Scholars have increasingly explored Ruth in ways which allow it to address contemporary issues. Feminists, for example, have recast the story as one of the dignity of labour and female self-sufficiency, and as a model for lesbian relations, while others have seen in it a celebration of the relationship between strong and resourceful women. Others have criticized it for its underlying, and potentially exploitative, acceptance of a system of patriarchy in which a woman's worth can only be measured through marriage and child-bearing. Yet others have seen it as a book that champions outcast and oppressed peoples.

Genealogy: the ancestry of David from Ruth

See also
 Goel
 Gleaning
 Levirate marriage
 Genealogy of Jesus

Notes

References

Bibliography

External links 

Jewish translations and study guides
 Ruth at Mechon Mamre – (Jewish Publication Society of America Version, 1917)
 Jewish Virtual Library
 Jewish Encyclopedia
 Ruth – English translation [with Rashi commentary]

Christian translations and study guides
 The Kinsman Redeemer
 Online Bible – GospelHall.org
 Biblegateway
 Bible Study on Cross-Cultural Love – InterVarsity website
 Redeemed
  Various versions

Non-affiliated translations and study guides
 The Heavenly Fire: Ruth (PDF) (Creative Commons translation with in-depth introduction and extensive translation notes)

Encyclopedic entries
 Catholic Encyclopedia

 
6th-century BC books
5th-century BC books
4th-century BC books
Ketuvim
Moab
Shavuot
Historical books